This is a list of schools in the City of Westminster in London.

Westminster Children's Services administers many primary and secondary schools. In addition there are several Church of England (CE), Roman Catholic (RC), and Christian non-denominational (ND) schools in the city.

There are also many non-profit-making independent schools, funded by a combination of tuition fees, long-term endowments, gifts and sometimes small commercial ventures directly connected to a school's educational activities. Please see the lists of Junior and Senior independent schools after those of the state-funded schools:

State-funded schools

Primary schools

All Souls CE Primary School
Ark Atwood Primary Academy
Ark King Solomon Academy
Barrow Hill Junior School
Burdett Coutts and Townsland CE Primary School
Christ Church Bentinck CE Primary School
Churchill Gardens Primary Academy
Edward Wilson Primary School
Essendine Primary School
Gateway Academy
George Eliot Primary School
Hallfield Primary School
Hampden Gurney CE Primary School
Millbank Academy
The Minerva Academy
Our Lady Of Dolours RC Primary School
Paddington Green Primary School
Pimlico Primary
Queen's Park Primary School
Robinsfield Infant School
St Augustine's CE Primary School
St Barnabas CE Primary School
St Clement Danes CE Primary School
St Edward's RC Primary School
St Gabriel's CE Primary School
St George's Hanover Square CE Primary School
St James and St John CE Primary School
St Joseph's RC Primary School
St Luke's CE Primary School
St Mary Magdalene CE Primary School
St Mary of the Angels RC Primary School
St Mary's Bryanston Square CE Primary School
St Matthew's CE School
St Peter's CE School
St Peter's Eaton Square CE Primary School
St Saviour's CE Primary School
St Stephen's CE Primary School
St Vincent De Paul RC Primary School
St Vincent's RC Primary School
Soho Parish CE Primary School
Wilberforce Primary School

Secondary schools

Ark King Solomon Academy
Grey Coat Hospital
Harris Academy St John's Wood
Marylebone Boys' School
Paddington Academy
Pimlico Academy
St Augustine's Church of England High School
St George's Catholic School
St Marylebone School
Westminster Academy
Westminster City School

Special and alternative schools
College Park School
Ormiston Beachcroft Academy 
Queen Elizabeth II Jubilee School
The St Marylebone Church of England Bridge School

Further education
City of Westminster College
Fashion Retail Academy
Harris Westminster Sixth Form
Westminster Kingsway College

Independent schools

Primary and preparatory schools

 Abercorn School (co-educational prep school)
 Arnold House School (boys' prep school)
 Connaught House School (co-educational prep school)
 Eaton House Belgravia School (boys' prep school)
 L'Ecole Bilingue Elementaire (co-educational prep school)
 Naima Jewish Preparatory School (Jewish, co-educational prep school)
 Prince's Gardens Preparatory School (co-educational prep school)
 St Christina's School (co-educational prep school)
 St John's Wood Pre Preparatory School (co-educational pre-prep school)
 St Nicholas Preparatory School (co-educational prep school)
 Westminster Abbey Choir School (CE, boy choristers only, boarding prep school)
 Westminster Cathedral Choir School (Catholic, boys' prep school)
 Westminster Under School (boys' prep school)

Senior and all-through schools

 The American School in London (co-educational international school, K-12)
 Bales College (co-educational day and boarding)
 Eaton Square School (co-educational day school)
 EIFA International School London (co-educational all-through school)
 Francis Holland School, Regent's Park campus (CE, girls)
 Halcyon London International School (co-educational international school)
 International Community School (co-educational international school)
 Kensington Park School (co-educational day and boarding)
 Maida Vale School (selective co-ed)
 Portland Place School (selective co-ed)
 Queen's College, London (ND, selective girls)
 Royal Ballet School (selective co-ed)
 Southbank International School (ND, selective co-ed)
 Sylvia Young Theatre School
 Westminster School (CE, selective boys, co-ed sixth form, day and boarding)
 Wetherby School (boys' selective)

Special and alternative schools
Abingdon House School
Fairley House School

References 

 
Westminster
Schools